On 31 December 2018 and 1 January 2019, a car was intentionally driven into crowds of people in the cities of Bottrop and Essen in Germany, injuring ten people. First media reports suspected a terrorist background. Later, the perpetrator was admitted to psychiatry and a surveyor certified that he is probably not guilty by reason of mental disease.

According to the judgment of the court of December 2019, the act had no xenophobic or terrorist background, but was triggered by an acute episode of paranoid schizophrenia.

Attack
On New Year's Eve, a 50-year-old attacker tried to hit a person with his car in Bottrop, but the man was able to avoid the vehicle. Minutes later, the man drove his car into a crowd of people at the Berliner Platz in Bottrop, injuring two men from Syria and Afghanistan, along with a woman and a child. In Essen, the man tried again to drive into a crowd of people who were waiting for a bus. Police stopped the man on the Rabenhorst street. Upon his arrest, the man reportedly expressed xenophobic and racist motives. The attacker is reported to have schizophrenia.

Reaction
Herbert Reul, Minister of the Interior of North Rhine-Westphalia said about the attack, that the perpetrator "wanted to kill people of foreign heritage."

Victims

In total, the perpetrator injured eight people, four of whom are a family from Syria, composed by two daughters aged 16 and 27 and the 48-year-old father who were slightly injured, and the 46-year-old mother who was critically injured and was operated. In addition, a 10-years-old boy also from Syria, a child of four years and a 29-years-old woman from Afghanistan were also hit and injured. The nationality and age of the eighth victim is unknown.

References

2018 road incidents
2019 road incidents
2018 in Germany
2019 in Germany
2010s in North Rhine-Westphalia
Attacks during the New Year celebrations
Attacks in Europe in 2018
Attacks in Europe in 2019
Bottrop
December 2018 crimes in Europe
Essen
January 2019 crimes in Europe
Vehicular rampage in Germany
2018 crimes in Germany
2019 crimes in Germany